Christoph II of Baden-Rodemachern (26 February 1537 – 2 August 1575, Rodemachern) was the first Margrave of Baden-Rodemachern.  He was the second son of Bernhard III of Baden-Baden and his wife Countess Franziska of Brienne and Luxembourg.

When Christopher II came of age in 1556, he renounced his right to a part of Baden-Baden to his older brother Philibert in exchange for an annual allowance of 4000 guilders.  He also received Rodemachern as an apanage, making him the founder of the elder Baden-Rodemachern line.

He started travelling.  From 1557 to 1561, he was in the Netherlands, where he joined the campaigns of the Spanish Army.  He went to Sweden in 1564, where he married a sister of King Eric XIV of Sweden.  He then returned to Rodemachern, where he built himself a palace and led a wasteful life.  In 1565, he travelled to London, where Queen Elizabeth I received him honorably.  However, he heaped debt upon debt and when he tried to leave in 1566, he found he couldn't leave the country until the Queen had provided surety.  Also in 1566, he inherited the Lordships of Useldange, Pettingen and Roußzy.

He continued to spend too much, and his country suffered from religious unrest.  His debts mounted.  He went to Sweden, where he served in the army and fought against Denmark.  His brother-in-law King John III of Sweden enfeoffed him with the island of Ösel.

After several years in Sweden, he returned to Rodemachern, where he died in 1575.  His was succeeded by his son Edward Fortunatus who was a minor at the time.

Marriage and issue 
Margrave Christoph II married on 11 November 1564 Princess Cecilia of Sweden (born: 6 November 1540; died: 27 January 1627), the daughter of King Gustav I of Sweden.  They had the following children:
 Edward Fortunatus (born: 17 September 1565; died: 18 June 1600), Margrave of Baden-Rodemachern and later of Baden-Baden
 Christopher Gustav (born: 13 August 1566; died: 18 January 1609)
 Philip III (born: 15 August 1567; died: 6 November 1620, Margrave of Baden-Rodemachern
 Charles (born: 7 March 1569; died: 1590)
 Bernhard (born: December 1570; died: February 1571)
 John Charles (born: 1572, died: 29 January 1599), joined the Knights Hospitaller

Ancestors

References and sources 
 

Margraves of Baden
1537 births
1575 deaths
16th-century German people
House of Zähringen